Mount Duchesnay is a  summit in British Columbia, Canada.

Description
Mount Duchesnay is located in Yoho National Park, in the Bow Range of the Canadian Rockies. Precipitation runoff from Mount Duchesnay drains into tributaries of the Kicking Horse River which is a tributary of the Columbia River. The peak is visible from Highway 1 (the Trans-Canada Highway). The nearest higher neighbor is Mount Stephen,  to the north-northeast.

History

At the suggestion of James Outram, the mountain was named in 1902 by David McNicoll (vice-president of Canadian Pacific Railway) to remember Charles-Edmond Juchereau Duchesnay (June 23, 1854 – September 4, 1901), Assistant General Superintendent of the railway's Western Division and son of Elzéar-Henri Juchereau Duchesnay. Duchesnay was killed by rockfall in a tunnel under construction near Spuzzum on September 4, 1901. The first ascent of the mountain was made in 1905 by a topographical survey team. The mountain's toponym was officially adopted on March 31, 1917, by the Geographical Names Board of Canada.

Geology

Mount Duchesnay is composed of sedimentary rock laid down during the Precambrian to Jurassic periods. Formed in shallow seas, this sedimentary rock was pushed east and over the top of younger rock during the Laramide orogeny.

Climate

Based on the Köppen climate classification, Mount Duchesnay is located in a subarctic climate zone with cold, snowy winters, and mild summers. Winter temperatures can drop below −20 °C with wind chill factors below −30 °C.

See also
Geography of British Columbia

References

External links
 Mount Duchesnay: Weather forecast
 Parks Canada web site: Yoho National Park

Two-thousanders of British Columbia
Canadian Rockies
Mountains of Yoho National Park
Kootenay Land District